Oya Baydar (born 1940) is a Turkish sociologist and writer. For a long time she was involved in socialist politics.

Education and early works
Oya Baydar studied at Lycée Notre Dame de Sion Istanbul. She published her first novel, inspired by French writer Françoise Sagan, while she was a student in high school. The novel she wrote in the last year of high school, God Has Forgot Children, was published both in the newspaper Hürriyet and as a book. She was almost expelled from her school as a result of writing this novel. After these novels written in high school years, she had a break from writing, interesting herself in politics for a long time, before returning to literature in later life.

Baydar graduated from Istanbul University's Department of Sociology in 1964 and entered this department as an assistant. The Professors' Council of the University twice rejected her doctoral thesis, about the rise of a labour force in Turkey: students occupied the University in order to protest against that. This was the first occupation of a university in Turkey. Baydar then became an assistant in Hacettepe University.

Political life
During the military coup in 1972 Baydar was arrested due to her socialist activity as a member of the Workers Party of Turkey and the Teachers' Union of Turkey and she left the University. Between 1972 and 1974 she worked as a columnist in the newspapers Yeni Ortam ([New Platform]) and Politika ([Politics]). She issued her first journal together with her husband Aydın Engin and Yusuf Ziya Bahadınlı. She was known as a socialist writer, researcher and activist woman.

During the 1980 military coup Baydar went abroad and remained in exile in Germany for 12 years, during which the German Democratic Republic ceased to exist when Germany was reunified. She wrote about this period in 1991 in her story book Farewell Alyosha.

Later life
Oya Baydar returned to Turkey in 1992. She worked as editor for the Istanbul Encyclopedia, a common project of the History Foundation and the Ministry of Culture, and as the editor-in-chief for The Unionism Encyclopedia of Turkey. She has won many awards for the novels and stories she published after returning to Turkey, and has become a well-liked writer. Since 2013 she has been writing for the online newspaper T24, particularly about the Kurdish problem (Kurdish–Turkish conflict (1978–present)).

Works

Novel
 Letters of Cats (Kedi Mektupları), 1993
 Turning to Nowhere (Hiçbiryer’e Dönüş), 1998
 Hot Ashes Left (Sıcak Külleri Kaldı), 2000
 (Erguvan Kapısı), 2004
 The Lost Word (Kayıp Söz), 2007
 The General of Garbage Heap (Çöplüğün Generali), 2009
 The age of war age of hope (Savaş Çağı Umut Çağı) (2010)
 That Wonderful Life of Yours ( O Muhteşem Hayatınız) (2012)

Story
 Farewell Alyosha (Elveda Alyoşa), 1991

Others
 Family Albums of the Republic (Cumhuriyetin Aile Albümleri)
 From Villages to Cities in 75 Years (75 Yılda Köylerden Şehirlere)
 (75 Yılda Çarklardan Chip'lere)
 (75 Yılda Çarkları Döndürenler)
 Changing Life Changing Person in 75 Years - Fashions of the Republic (75 Yılda Değişen Yaşam Değişen İnsan-Cumhuriyet Modaları)
 Fashions of the Republic (Cumhuriyet Modaları)
 The Unionism Encyclopedia of Turkey (Türkiye Sendikacılık Ansiklopedisi)
 Two Era Two Women ( İki Dönem İki Kadın)

Awards 
 Sait Faik Story Award in 1991 (with Elveda Alyoşa)
 Yunus Nadi Novel Award in 1993 (with Kedi Mektupları)
 Orhan Kemal Novel Award in 2001 (with Sıcak Külleri Kaldı)
 Cevdet Kudret Literature Award in 2004 (with Erguvan Kapısı)
 Akdeniz Culture Award in 2011 (with Hiçbir Yere Dönüş (Back to Nowhere)''

References

Turkish novelists
Turkish women novelists
Living people
1940 births
Istanbul University alumni
Writers from Istanbul
Taraf people
Lycée Notre Dame de Sion Istanbul alumni